Ross Aubrey Lewis (November 9, 1902 – August 6, 1977) was an American editorial cartoonist who received the 1935 Pulitzer Prize for Editorial Cartooning. Lewis was born in Metamora, Michigan and graduated from Milwaukee State College in 1923.

References

1902 births
1977 deaths
American editorial cartoonists
Pulitzer Prize for Editorial Cartooning winners
People from Lapeer County, Michigan
Artists from Michigan